Toechima pterocarpum, also known as orange tamarind, is a species of plant in the lychee family that is endemic to Australia.

Description
The species grows as a large shrub or small tree to 4 m in height. The pinnate leaves are 12–24 cm long, with the oval to sickle-shaped leaflets 2–11 cm long. The flowers occur in pendulous inflorescences. The fruits are 3-lobed, winged, orange to red seed capsules 3 cm long.

Distribution and habitat
The species is known from the area around Julatten, Mossman and Wangetti in Far North Queensland. The plants are found in lowland tropical rainforest, often along streams, at elevations from sea level to 450 m.

Conservation
The species has been listed as Endangered under Australia's EPBC Act. The main threat is from land clearing for agriculture and housing.

References

pterocarpum
Flora of Queensland
Sapindales of Australia
Taxa named by Sally T. Reynolds
Plants described in 1985